Japanese football in 1935.

Emperor's Cup

Births
March 8 - Akira Kitaguchi

External links

 
Seasons in Japanese football